is a Japanese jidaigeki or period drama, that was broadcast in 1992.

Plot 
Matsudaira Tadateru the sixth son of Tokugawa Ieyasu was exiled from Tokugawa shogunate and he secretly lives in Yoshiwara in Edo. One day he accidentally meet Yagyū Jūbei. They start living in Yoshiwara's "Hanabusarō" and fight against the shogunate's huge conspiracy while guarding Yoshiwara.

Cast 
Sonny Chiba as Matsudaira Tadateru
Hideki Saijō as Yagyū Jūbei Mitsuyoshi
Hajime Hana as Kyoya Shozaemon
Taro Shigaki as Tokugawa Iemitsu
Shōji Ishibashi as Saheiji
Kumiko Takahashi as Chiyono Dayu
Shōji Nakayama as Matsudaira Nobutsuna

References

1992 Japanese television series debuts
1990s drama television series
Jidaigeki television series
Cultural depictions of Tokugawa Iemitsu
Television series set in the 17th century